Pop Life is the fifth studio album by English group Bananarama, released on 13 May 1991 by London Records. It is the only Bananarama studio album which features singer Jacquie O'Sullivan, who replaced Siobhan Fahey upon her departure in 1988. This album marks the end of the group's association with the Stock Aitken Waterman production team (they produced only two songs) as most of Pop Life was produced by Youth (real name Martin Glover). English singer Zoë provided backing vocals on "Long Train Running". This would be the last album by Bananarama as a trio.

Background and recording
After Bananarama's first world tour in 1989, they started recording their fifth album with producers Stock, Aitken and Waterman (SAW), but were dissatisfied with the results of those sessions, thinking the majority of those songs of sub-par quality, although "Ain't No Cure" and "Heartless" were eventually included on the album. They started looking for other producers, first working with David Z with whom the group recorded "Some Boys", but felt it was not the direction they wanted to follow and the song remained unreleased until 2013. They then worked with Steve Jolley who, along with Tony Swain, had produced the group's first three records. A song co-written by him, "Is Your Love Strong Enough" ended up on the album, while another remains unreleased. They settled with Youth, who had been Sara Dallin's boyfriend years before and whom the group knew well, to produce the majority of the album.

The album was a departure from Bananarama's previous albums as it incorporates a much more diverse range of musical genres, including flamenco guitar (a cover of the Doobie Brothers song "Long Train Running" featuring Alma de Noche, a pseudonym for the Gipsy Kings), retro-rock ("Only Your Love", "Outta Sight"), acid house ("Tripping on Your Love"), reggae ("What Colour R the Skies Where U Live?"), experimental club ("Megalomaniac"), and their hallmark Euro disco sound ("Preacher Man", "Ain't No Cure").

The band completely re-recorded that SAW track "Ain't No Cure" with Youth, intending to place it on the album, but a furious response by SAW ultimately saw the band relent, and include the original track on the album. The song was recorded by SAW produced girl group Delage in 1991, although it was not released until 1997.

Critical reception
Upon its release, Pop Life received positive reviews from critics. Chuck Eddy from Entertainment Weekly gave it an A, writing, "The album, while energetic, is far moodier than anything they’ve ever done. The Gipsy Kings, those techno-flamenco gods, help engineer the Doobie Brothers’ ”Long Train Running” into a scary locomotive blues. Other tracks venture deep into the dark tunnel of dreamland: Pulses from an alternate universe underline fizzy computerized harmonies; sleepy voices trying hard to wake up ask ”What color are the skies where you live?” ”Megalomaniac” is a wild bopper about running away, not from something, just running. Two other songs even have heavy psychedelic guitars. We usually visit Bananaramaland to escape our problems, but this album takes us to an eerier place than we’d ever expect."

Chart performance
Commercially, the album reached number 42 in the United Kingdom, number 37 in Sweden, and number 146 in Australia. Four mid-charting singles were issued from the album, and following the release of "Tripping on Your Love", O'Sullivan left the group, leaving members Sara Dallin and Keren Woodward to continue as a duo.

Track listing
CD version
"Preacher Man" – 3:15 (Sara Dallin, Youth, Andy Caine)
"Long Train Running" – 3:31 (Tom Johnston)
"Only Your Love" – 3:58 (Sara Dallin, Youth, Andy Caine)
"What Colour R the Skies Where U Live?" – 4:27 (Sara Dallin, Youth, Andy Caine, Keren Woodward)
"Is Your Love Strong Enough" – 5:07 (Sara Dallin, Steve Jolley)
"Tripping on Your Love" – 3:20 (Sara Dallin, Youth, Andy Caine, Danny Schogger)
"Ain't No Cure" – 3:27 (Mike Stock, Matt Aitken, Pete Waterman, Sara Dallin)
"Outta Sight" – 4:31 (Sara Dallin, Youth, Andy Caine)
"Megalomaniac" – 6:16 (Sara Dallin, Bassey Walker, Youth, Andy Caine)
"I Can't Let You Go" – 6:10 (Sara Dallin, Youth, Andy Caine)
"Heartless" – 3:22 (Mike Stock, Matt Aitken, Pete Waterman, Sara Dallin, Keren Woodward)
"Preacher Man" (Ramabanana Alternative Mix) – 7:31 (Sara Dallin, Youth, Andy Caine)

Cassette version
"Preacher Man" – 3:15
"Long Train Running" – 3:31
"Only Your Love" – 3:58
"What Colour R the Skies Where U Live?" – 4:27
"Is Your Love Strong Enough" – 5:07
"Tripping on Your Love" – 3:20
"Ain't No Cure" – 3:27
"Outta Sight" – 4:31
"Megalomaniac" – 6:16
"I Can't Let You Go" – 6:10

2007 CD re-issue plus bonus tracks
"Preacher Man" – 3:15
"Long Train Running" – 3:31
"Only Your Love" – 3:58
"What Colour R the Skies Where U Live?" – 4:27
"Is Your Love Strong Enough" – 5:07
"Tripping on Your Love" – 3:20
"Ain't No Cure" – 3:27
"Outta Sight" – 4:31
"Megalomaniac" – 6:16
"I Can't Let You Go" – 6:10
"Heartless" – 3:22
"Only Your Love" (7-inch mix) - 4:02
"Preacher Man" (alternative 7-inch mix) - 3:39
"Megalomaniac" (edit) - 4:35
"Tripping on Your Love" (single mix) - 3:15
"What Colour R the Skies Where U Live?" (J-Jagged Mix) - 6:24
"Ain't No Cure" (alternative version) - 4:03

2013 Deluxe Edition 2CD/DVD re-issue

Disc 1

"Preacher Man" - 3.14
"Long Train Running" - 3.30
"Only Your Love" - 3.58
"What Colour R The Skies Where U Live?" - 4.27
"Is Your Love Strong Enough?" - 5.06
"Tripping on Your Love" - 3.19
"Ain't No Cure" - 3.27
"Outta Sight" - 4.32
"Megalomaniac"  - 6.22
"I Can't Let You Go" - 6.07
"Heartless" - 3.20
"I Don't Care" - 6.16
"Some Boys" - 5.33
"Only Your Love" [Milky Bar Mix] - 8.11
"Tripping on Your Love" [Dance Floor Justice Mix] - 6.10
"Preacher Man" [Original 12" Mix] - 6.08

Disc 2

"Only Your Love" [Monkey Drum Mooch] - 7.33
"Preacher Man" [Ramabanana Alternative Mix] - 7.31
"Long Train Running" [Alma De Noche Version] - 6.39
"Tripping on Your Love"[Euro Trance Mix] - 7.20
"Ain't No Cure" [Alternative Version] - 4.06
"What Colour R The Skies Where U Live?" [Paco's Revenge Mix] - 6.55
"Tripping on Your Love" [Smoove Mix] - 7.07
"I Don't Care" [Tony King Remix] - 6.10
"Ain't No Cure" [Original 12" Mix] - 7.02
"Tripping on Your Love" [Silky 70s Mix] - 6.26
"Long Train Running" [Sparky’s Magic Button Mix] - 4.34
"Tripping on Your Love" [Sweet Exorcist Remix] - 8.12

DVD

"Only Your Love"
"Preacher Man"
"Long Train Running"
"Tripping on Your Love"
"Only Your Love" [On Wogan]
"Preacher Man" [On Top of the Pops]

Unreleased songs and demos
"Nothing Lasts Forever"
"Don't Throw It All Away"

Personnel
Bananarama
 Sara Dallin – vocals
 Jacquie O'Sullivan – vocals
 Keren Woodward – vocals
Additional personnel
Youth – bass, keyboards, drum programming 
Crispin "Spry" Robinson – percussion
Johnny Mars – harmonica
Nigel Butler – additional keyboards
Paul Cooke – additional drums
Andy Caine – guitar and bass on "Long Train Running"
Alma De Noche (Gipsy Kings) – voice and flamenco guitar on "Long Train Running"
Guy Pratt – additional keyboards on "Long Train Running"
Danny Schogger – additional keyboards on "Long Train Running" and "Tripping On Your Love"
 Zoë – backing vocals on "Long Train Running"
 Carol Kenyon – backing vocals on "Long Train Running"
Robin Goodfellow – bass on "Is Your Love Strong Enough"
Paul Inder – bass on "Outta Sight"
Linda Taylor – additional backing vocals on "Preacher Man", "Only Your Love", "What Colour R the Skies Where U Live?" and "I Can't Let You Go"
Technical
 Shep Pettibone – additional production and remix on "Preacher Man"
Robin Goodfellow – engineer
 Ellen Von Unwerth – photography

Charts

References

1991 albums
Albums produced by Youth (musician)
Albums produced by Stock Aitken Waterman
Bananarama albums
London Records albums